A number of steamships have been named Pretoria

Ship names